

Legislative Assembly elections
Legislative Assembly elections in India were conducted for Patiala & East Punjab States Union legislative assembly and Travancore-Cochin legislative assembly in 1954. In Patiala & East Punjab States Union, Indian National Congress won an absolute majority. While in Travancore-Cochin, no single party got the majority.

Patiala & East Punjab States Union*

* : On 1 November 1956, under States Reorganisation Act, 1956, Patiala & East Punjab States Union was merged with Punjab.

Travancore-Cochin*

* : In 1956, under States Reorganisation Act, 1956, Travancore-Cochin state was merged with the Malabar district of Madras State, Kasaragod taluk of the South Canara district and the Amindive Islands to form a new state Kerala. The southern part of Travancore-Cochin, Kanyakumari district was transferred to Madras State.

See also
 1951–52 elections in India
 1955 elections in India

References

External links

Election Commission of India

1954 elections in India
India
1954 in India
Elections in India by year